The 9th Infantry Regiment ("Manchu") is a parent infantry regiment of the United States Army.

Unrelated units designated the 9th Infantry Regiment were organized in the United States Army in 1798 during the Quasi-War, in 1812 during the war of 1812, and in 1847 during the Mexican–American War. The 1812 regiment fought in the Battle of Lundy's Lane, and the 1847 regiment in the Battle for Mexico City.

The lineage of the current regiment begins with the 1855 organization of the 9th Infantry Regiment, which was dispatched to the Pacific Northwest, where it served in the American Indian Wars. The regiment remained in the west during the American Civil War, garrisoning posts near San Francisco. After the end of the American Civil War the regiment continued its service through the final Indian Wars, then fought at the Battle of San Juan Hill during the Spanish–American War. During the Boxer Rebellion, the 9th Infantry was sent to China, where it earned the nickname Manchu. After the end of the rebellion the regiment saw duty in the Philippine–American War.

In 1917 the regiment became part of the 2nd Infantry Division, with which it served during World War I, World War II, and the Korean War. Reorganized as a parent regiment during the late 1950s as the United States Army adapted its organization to the Cold War, its 4th Battalion served with the 25th Infantry Division in the Vietnam War. The 9th's 1st, 2nd, and 3rd Battalions served in the 1989–1990 United States invasion of Panama, Operation Just Cause, with the 7th Infantry Division (Light). Its 1st and 4th Battalions fought in the Iraq War; the 4th Battalion is, the only remaining active battalion of the regiment, stationed at Fort Carson with the 1st Stryker Brigade Combat Team, 4th Infantry Division.

History

Early organizations  
The 9th Infantry Regiment is one of the first units authorized in the United States Army. It first appeared as a result of the Act of 16 July 1798, that authorized twelve additional regiments of infantry, in January 1799. Josiah Carville Hall, of Maryland, was its lieutenant colonel. All of the officers were appointed from Maryland, and the regiment was recruited in that state. However it was disbanded 15 June 1800. It appeared again serving in the War of 1812, it was again organized in March 1812, with Simon Learned, of Massachusetts, as colonel. The regiment was raised in Massachusetts, and took part in the war on the northern border, being present at the Battle of Lundy's Lane, and other actions in that area. Following the war in the reorganization of the army, this regiment was again disbanded. These early versions of the 9th Infantry have no lineage connection to the regiment that was formed in 1855.

Mexican War
As a result of the Mexican–American War, in April 1847, the 9th Infantry was again organized, as one of the ten one-year regiments authorized by the Act of 11 February 1847.  It was recruited primarily from the six New England states.  It was briefly commanded by Colonel (and future President of the United States) Franklin Pierce before Pierce was promoted to brigadier general and commander of the brigade that included the 9th Regiment. Pierce was succeeded by Colonel Truman B. Ransom, who was killed in the assault upon Chapultepec Castle. Ransom was succeeded by Colonel Jones M. Withers, who resigned 23 May 1848, and he was succeeded by Colonel Henry L. Webb.

The regiment served in the Mexico City campaign and was in the Battle of Contreras, Battle of Churubusco, Battle of Molino del Rey and at the Battle of Chapultepec where it took a distinguished part. At the Battle of Chapultepec it was in support of the storming force, but joined with it as a part of the assault on the citadel. Sixteen officers and eleven enlisted men of the regiment were mentioned by name in the report of Major General Gideon Pillow for meritorious conduct in this battle, among the former being Second Lieutenant R. C. Drum, later a general.  Another officer who served with the regiment was Major William B. Taliaferro, who became a major general in the Confederate States Army during the American Civil War.

Following the end of the war, the regiment returned to the United States where, by 26 August 1848, its officers and soldiers were discharged and the regiment was disbanded.

Similar to the earlier versions of the 9th Infantry, the Mexican-American War iteration has no lineage connection to the current 9th Infantry Regiment.

Oregon and Washington Territory Indian Wars 
Between March and November 1855, the 9th Infantry Regiment was again organized under Colonel George Wright at Fortress Monroe, Virginia.  It has remained in continuous existence since then; the lineage of the currently active regiment is traced back to this organization. Silas Casey was its Lieutenant-colonel, and Edward Steptoe, and Robert S. Garnett were its Majors.  In December 1855 the regiment was ordered to the Pacific Coast, via Panama, arriving in the latter part of January 1856.  The headquarters and Companies A, B, C, E, F, G, I and K, took station at Fort Vancouver, Washington Territory.  Lieutenant-Colonel Casey with Companies D and H going to Fort Steilacoom, and was plunged into operations against the Nisqually, Muckleshoot, Puyallup, and Klickitat in the Puget Sound War.

From March 1856, Colonel Wright with companies from Fort Vancouver were fighting the Yakima War. Following the close of field operations until the spring of 1858, the regiment was engaged in building posts and making roads. In August 1857, Company F was detailed as escort to the Northern Boundary Commission and remained in the field on that duty nearly three years.

In 1858, during part of the wars with Native Americans in the West, the 9th was posted at Fort Dalles in Oregon Territory under the command of then Colonel George Wright. In May 1858, Company E under Major Steptoe formed part of a force of one hundred and fifty-nine men sent to make a reconnaissance of the country to the north of Fort Walla Walla.  On 17 May 1858, Steptoe's command was attacked by over one thousand Indians in the Battle of Pine Creek which triggered the Spokane – Coeur d'Alene – Paloos War.  In August 1858, an expedition from Fort Dalles under Colonel Wright proceed against the Spokane Indians and their allies.  The following Battle of Four Lakes brought about a lasting peace with the Indians of eastern Washington.

In October 1860, Captain Frederick Tracy Dent with Company B and a detachment of Company E, left Fort Walla Walla, to rescue the emigrants who had escaped from the Salmon Falls Massacre, on the Snake River. In May 1861, a detachment of the regiment was detailed as an escort to the Fort Benton wagon road expedition, for nearly fifteen months.

Civil War and late 19th-century Indian wars 
During the American Civil War, the 9th Infantry Regiment was ordered to San Francisco prior to its transfer to the East. Its colonel, George Wright, was promoted to command of the Department of the Pacific, and the order was revoked. The regiment was left on the Pacific Coast, where it had duty at the posts near San Francisco, performing provost guard duty in that city until late in 1865. Following the death of Colonel Wright in the wreck of the steamer Brother Jonathan, Colonel John H. King succeeded to command of the 9th Regiment in December 1866.

During the period from 1866 to 1869, elements of the regiment were in the Snake War in Northern California and Oregon and in conflict with the Chemehuevi in Southern California. In June 1869, the regiment was ordered to the Department of the Platte, where it absorbed the 2nd establishment of the 27th Infantry Regiment. It was from the 27th Infantry Regiment that the regiment gets its Civil War battle honors, derived from the 2nd Battalion of the 18th Infantry Regiment that was the cadre around which the 27th formed at the end of the Civil War.

Following the reorganization the 9th Infantry performed garrison duty at various posts and guard duty on the Union Pacific Railroad line. In May 1873, six companies, A, D, E, F, H and I, were sent to the Department of Dakota for duty with the Yellowstone Expedition, escorting the engineers locating the Northern Pacific Railroad. From the summer of 1874 to May 1876, the regiment was stationed at posts on or near the Sioux reservation in Nebraska and Wyoming and was almost constantly escorting wagon trains. In the summer of 1875 Companies C, E and H, were in the Black Hills, Dakota, as part of the escort to the Newton–Jenney Party, Company E remained in the field until November assisting in ejecting white intruders who had entered Sioux territory.

In May 1876, Companies C, G and H became a part of the Big Horn and Yellowstone Expedition under command of Brigadier General Crook and were in the field until late in October taking part in the engagement with the Indians at Tongue River, Montana, 9 June, the Battle of the Rosebud, and the Battle of Slim Buttes. Companies G and H also assisted in repelling a night attack by Indians on the camp on Goose Creek, Wyoming, 9 July 1876. In the early part of September the entire command was without rations for a number of days, and subsisted on horse flesh and a small quantity of dried meat and fruit captured at Slim Buttes. In October 1876, the Powder River Expedition was organized and Companies A, B, D, F, I and K formed a part of it. They remained in the field until January 1877, during the most severe part of the winter, and practically brought to a termination the Great Sioux War of 1876.

In July 1877, Companies B, D, F, H, I and K were a part of the force sent to Chicago, Illinois, at the time of the Great Railroad Strike of 1877. They remained a month performing guard duty over various public and private institutions.

During the summer and fall of 1878 Companies B, C, H and I were a part of a force of observation on the Little Missouri River, and in the northwestern part of the Black Hills.

In October 1878 Companies G and K were part of the force in the field in the Cheyenne War. Company K was mounted and took active part in the pursuit.

In October 1879, Companies E and K went into the field in the White River War, remaining until July 1880.

In 1883, Col. John S. Mason, took command of the 9th Regiment and in July 1886, the regiment went to the Department of Arizona. During their service there the regiment was in garrisons at every post in Arizona and at some posts in New Mexico. Four companies, C, E, H and I, were in the field in New Mexico for about a month during the Apache campaign of 1886 against Geronimo.

Following the end of the Indian Wars the regiment participated in the Spanish–American War. It fought in the Battle of San Juan Hill A member of the ninth infantry, Ira C. Welborn, was awarded the Medal of Honor for going under enemy fire to save a private.

20th century

Boxer Rebellion 

At the beginning of the century the U.S. Army dispatched the 9th Infantry Regiment to Qing China during the Boxer Rebellion and the China Relief Expedition where the regiment earned the nickname "Manchus".

During the Battle of Tientsin, three 9th Regiment soldiers received the Medal of Honor and the regimental commander, Col. Emerson H. Liscum, was killed by Chinese fire, as was the flag bearer for the regiment. A Chinese sniper shot Liscum as he tried to steady the flag after the bearer was killed. The Chinese again unleashed a torrent of fire upon the Allies, which forced them to lie face down in mud. The dark blue uniform of the American troops provided a virtual bull's eye to the Chinese troops, equipped with western firearms, such as Winchesters, Mausers, and Mannlichers. Many American troops died from Chinese sniper fire before they took the city. The regiment suffered a ten percent casualty rate in the battle.

Colonel Liscum's dying words gave the regiment its motto, "Keep up the Fire."  Lt. Col. Charles A. Coolidge assumed command, the Allies then captured the city. Additionally, the 9th Regiment saved millions of dollars worth of silver from being looted from a government mint. In a show of gratitude from the Chinese government, the regiment was awarded two silver ingots from which the Liscum Bowl was created. The regiment fought in the Battle of Yangcun.

Philippines 
  

Following duty in China the regiment served in the Philippine–American War; Company C of the Regiment suffered casualties in the Balangiga massacre of September 1901.

World War I 
In early October 1917, the Manchus deployed to France as part of the "Indianhead" 2nd Infantry Division. During the course of the war, 9th infantrymen earned battle streamers for their colors at Lorraine, He de France, Aisne-Marne, and St. Mihiel. In 1918, the Manchu Regiment received the French Fourragère for gallantry during the Meuse-Argonne offensive.

World War II 

The 9th Infantry Regiment returned to Europe with the Second Infantry Division in October 1943 for the invasion of France. After breaking out from the Normandy beachhead the Manchus participated in the fight for Hill 192, a pivotal strongpoint in The Battle of Saint-Lo and participated in the Battle for Brest. In December 1944 the 9th Infantry was at Elsenborn Ridge where it waged an 18-hour engagement during the Battle of the Bulge. After the reduction of the German salient, the 9th spearheaded a 1945 drive toward the Siegfried Line. The Manchus crossed the Rhine in March 1945 and advanced rapidly through Saxony into Czechoslovakia, ending the war with many decorations including three Presidential Unit Citations.

Korean War 

When South Korea was invaded in 1950 the Manchus returned to the far east and the Korean Peninsula.  Manchu troops were the first of the 2nd Infantry Division to engage North Korean forces, at Yongsan in August 1950, against numerically superior force. They were later successful at Bloody Ridge, Heartbreak Ridge, Old Baldy, Pork Chop Hill, and T-Bone Hill. During the Korean War, the regiment earned an additional Presidential Unit Citation for its gallant service at Hongchon, and six of its members received the Medal of Honor: Loren R. Kaufman (4 and 5 September 1950), Edward C. Krzyzowski (31 August to 3 September 1951), Joseph R. Ouellette (31 August to 3 September 1951), David M. Smith (1 September 1950), Luther H. Story (1 September 1950) and Travis E. Watkins (31 August to 3 September 1950).

On 20 June 1957 the regiment was relieved from the 2nd Infantry Division and reorganized as a parent regiment under the Combat Arms Regimental System.

Vietnam War 
On 14 January 1966, the 4th Battalion, 9th Infantry Regiment, was relieved from assignment to the 171st Infantry Brigade and assigned to the 25th Infantry Division "Tropic Lightning" at Schofield Barracks, Hawaii. A month earlier these Manchus had been in Alaska preparing for annual winter maneuvers to be conducted in temperatures of 50 below zero. Eight weeks later the battalion was preparing for deployment to the heat and humidity of South Vietnam.

On 29 April, the battalion disembarked the ship General Walker at Vũng Tàu, Vietnam. Within hours of their arrival they found themselves under fire as their convoy made its way to the 25th Division's Củ Chi Base Camp. The next day, a little more than 24 hours after arriving in country, Alpha company engaged the enemy in a firefight – setting the tone of regular contact that would characterize the Manchu experience for the next four and a half years.

Many operations were conducted by company-sized or smaller units but there were also notable larger scale operations in which the entire battalion took part. They included Asheville, Wahiawa, Joliet I and II, Helemano, and Kahana I and II.

On 22 February 1968 the Manchus closed the Katum Camp which had served as the large forward base for the 1st BDE near the Cambodian border. After a day at Tây Ninh Combat Base to prepare, the Manchus moved out to Củ Chi and eventually arrived north of Tan Son Nhut on 25 February. The mission was to find and destroy rocket sites that had been used to fire on Tan Son Nhut Air Base since the Tet Offensive began nearly a month earlier. At 9:00 AM on 2 March 1968, the Manchus walked into what was to become one of the worst single-encounter loss of life incidents in the history of the Vietnam war. Forty-nine members of Charlie Company were killed and 24 wounded in an ambush by a large communist force on Route 248 north and east of Tan Son Nhut near the small village of Quoi Xuan. In addition, C Company suffered 24 wounded while D Company suffered casualties in the fighting to reach Charlie Company. SP4 Nicholas J. Cutinha would be posthumously awarded the Medal of Honor for his actions at Quoi Xuan. Manchu Alpha, Bravo, and Delta continued operations in this area and took many more casualties until finally leaving on 11 March 1968. Rocket sites had been destroyed, and a formidable communist force had been weakened, if not destroyed. But, it had come at a great cost to the Manchus and particularly Charlie Company.

In the four years and six months of service in Vietnam with the 25th Division, the 4th Battalion of the Manchus received two Presidential Citations and added 12 campaign streamers to regimental colors for combat operations in the Republic of Vietnam (South Vietnam). It is estimated that 450 4th Battalion Manchus were killed in the Vietnam War.

Three Manchus were posthumous recipients of the Medal of Honor, the United States' highest award for valor: Nicholas J. Cutinha, Ruppert L. Sargent and Maximo Yabes.

1970s 
After its service in the Vietnam war, the regiment was transferred back to the United States and was stationed in Alaska. During the Vietnam War, the 6th Battalion of the 9th Infantry Regiment was assigned to the 171st Infantry Brigade at Fort Wainwright, Alaska. The majority of the unit's training was in light infantry winter operations. The training consisted of developing cold weather operations and mountaineering skills. Modes of transportation included using skis or snowshoes and pulling equipment on Ahkio sleds; helicopters; or Air Force transport aircraft. Company C, 6th Battalion was an Airborne unit, and was the first of the "Charlie Airborne" companies stationed in Alaska. Summer training was primarily adventurous in nature, and included encampments at primitive locations within the state. The 6th Battalion was also a regular participant in the annual 'Alaska Days' parade in Sitka. The 9th Infantry Regiment was included in this event because it was stationed in Sitka when the Alaska Purchase was finalized, and Alaska was turned over to the United States by Imperial Russia. In 1972, the 6th Battalion was inactivated, and its Soldiers and equipment were used to reactivate the 4th Battalion, 9th Infantry Regiment. The 4th Battalion was assigned to the 172nd Infantry Brigade at Fort Richardson, but remained stationed at Fort Wainwright, and its Company C was retained on airborne status.

In the summer of 1975, the inactive 2nd Battalion was activated and assigned to the 1st Brigade, 2nd Infantry Division, at Camp Casey, Republic of Korea (South Korea). In March 1976, the 2nd Battalion moved to Camp Greaves near the DMZ, with A Company manning Camp Liberty Bell. Missions there included reconnaissance patrols within the DMZ; manning Guard Posts Collier and Oulette, both located within the DMZ and supporting the United Nations Command Joint Security Force at Camp Kitty Hawk; securing Freedom Bridge, spanning the route south from Panmunjom across the Imjim river; and manning a small sector of the southern boundary fence of the DMZ. (Camp Kitty Hawk was later renamed Camp Bonifas in memory of Captain Arthur Bonifas, who was murdered along with Lieutenant Mark Barrett by North Korean troops during the Axe Murder Incident, which resulted in Operation Paul Bunyan being conducted by the United States Army.)

In late 1978, the 2nd Battalion was relieved of duty on the DMZ by its sister 1st Battalion, 9th Infantry Regiment. The 1st Battalion had been stationed at Camp Hovey and Camp Liberty bell was commanded by LTC Clinton Fields. The 1st Battalion continued the mission to man Guard Posts Oulette and Collier, conduct combat and recon patrols, man the southern entrance to the DMZ and maintain the bridge platoon that guarded Freedom Bridge. LTC Clinton Fields relinquished command of the 1st Battalion to LTC Michael D. Collins soon after the move from Camp Hovey to Camp Greaves.

1980s and 1990s 

Early in 1989, the Manchus deployed to Panama as part of a show-of-force Operation Nimrod Dancer along with other U.S. forces.  The 9th was based out of Fort Ord.  Units of the 9th conducted route reconnaissance and security patrols between Forts Sherman and Gulick on the other side of the Panama Canal.  Bravo Company of 2nd BN, commanded by CPT Warren Bishop, and an Engineer squad occupied an abandoned Officer's Club on Fort Gulick and conducted live presence patrolling to protect American families living on Fort Gulick who at the time were being harassed by Panamanian forces. The 9th was fully re-deployed by the end of November 1989 and returned less than a month later for the U.S. invasion.  During Operation Just Cause in December 1989, the Manchus were called upon again. Infantrymen from the 1st, 2nd, and 3rd Battalions earned the Combat Infantryman Badge (CIB) for the first time since Korea.  Initially DOD awarded the CIB to all soldiers who took part in Just Cause, but subsequently rescinded the awards after closer review of regulations found that the CIB could only be awarded to 11-series MOS (infantry) soldiers.  This led to an attempt by a number of 1st Battalion infantrymen to return their CIBs in solidarity with the combat medics, air defenders, and others who had to take up the rifle and engage in the same house to house and jungle fighting as the infantry.

Panama was the last conflict fought by the Manchus under the 7th Infantry Division (Light). During both operations, the regimental commander was Colonel David R.E. Hale. One of Hale's key commanders in Panama, Lt. Col. Chuck Swannack went on to become a major general and commander of the 82nd Airborne Division in Iraq from 2002 to 2004.  Another key officer was Lt. Col. William J. "Bill" Leszczynski, Jr., who later commanded the 75th Ranger Regiment and was promoted to brigadier general.  Hale himself became a major general, but was forced into retirement because of personal misconduct of a sexual nature.  Hale was subsequently court-martialed in 1999 and reduced in rank (for retired pay purposes) to brigadier general.

The 1st, 2nd, and 3rd BNs and the Regimental Headquarters (along with the Regimental Treasure, including the Liscum Bowl) were reassigned to Ft. Lewis, WA in late 1993, after the closure of Ft. Ord, which had been the home of the 7th ID (and consequently the 9th Regiment) prior to 1993.  The unit moved into the barracks near the 75th Ranger Battalion, adjacent to Grey Army Airfield on the main post of Ft. Lewis.  One of the last cohort units of basic training recruits (B Co, 38th ID, Ft. Benning) which were initially assigned to the 7th ID, Ft. Ord, were subsequently either reassigned to other mechanized units or reassigned to the 9th in Ft. Lewis just prior to graduation and were quickly integrated into the 9th once they reported for duty there.  The 1st, 2nd and 3rd Battalions of the 9th continued to serve from Ft. Lewis for the next two years, before being reassigned to the 25th Infantry Division.

The 4th and 5th Battalions, 9th Infantry Regiment were activated back at Fort Wainwright, Alaska in 1986.  They were assigned to the 1st Brigade of the 6th Infantry Division (Arctic Light) and were specially trained in Arctic warfare.  The 5th Battalion was reflagged 1st Battalion, 17th Infantry Regiment in 1994 and the 4th Battalion was reflagged 2nd Battalion, 1st Infantry Regiment in 1995.  These renamings occurred prior to the brigade being redesignated as the 172nd Infantry Brigade and the division being deactivated.

In January 1995, the 1st Battalion, 9th Infantry Regiment, along with augmentation from the 79th Forward Support Battalion, 2nd Battalion, 8th Field Artillery (Automatic), and the 13th Engineer Company, deployed from Fort Lewis, WA to Guantanamo Bay, Cuba in support of Operation Sea Signal where they provided transportation and security for Cuban and Haitian immigrants awaiting movement to the United States by supporting camps Echo, Foxtrot, and Golf. The 1st of the 9th, known as Task Force 1st Manchu, returned to Fort Lewis, WA in June 1995. August 1995 the 1st Brigade, 7th Infantry Division (sometimes erroneously referred to as the 9th Regimental Combat Team, although RCTs have not existed in Army force structure since the late 1950s), which included the battalions of the 9th Infantry at Fort Lewis, WA, was reflagged as the 1st Brigade, 25th Infantry Division and the Manchu name and colors returned to the 2nd Infantry Division stationed in Korea.  The reflagging ceremony took place on I Corps' parade grounds and included a "Drink the Fire" ceremony, during which all assigned Manchu soldiers drank a toast from the Liscum Bowl.

The 1st and 2nd Battalions of the 9th Infantry Regiment returned to Korea in September 1995 (i.e. units already deployed in Korea were redesignated as the 1st and 2nd Battalions).

21st century 

1st Battalion of the 9th Infantry Regiment (Manchu) recently returned from a tour in Iraq, serving in Operation Iraqi Freedom I and II from August 2004 to July 2005 where C.Co 1–9 Infantry (Manchu) 1st and 2nd platoon participated in the initial attacks of the Second Battle of Fallujah (Operation Phantom Fury). Upon returning stateside the Manchu's were based at Fort Carson, Colorado, as part of the 2nd Brigade Combat Team of the Second Infantry Division.  In November 2005, the First Battalion of the 9th Infantry Regiment had the majority of their personnel transferred to the newly activated 3rd Squadron of the 61st Cavalry Regiment as part of the 2nd Brigade Combat Team, 2nd Infantry Division.  At the same time, the Unit Colors of the 1st Battalion, 503rd Infantry (also a part of the 2nd Brigade Combat Team at the time) was transferred to Vicenza, Italy to be stationed with the 173rd Infantry Brigade (Airborne), the personnel remaining at Fort Carson, Colorado were transferred to the 1st Battalion, 9th Infantry. The battalion deployed with 2nd Brigade Combat Team in support of Operation Iraqi Freedom 06–08 to Ramadi, successfully defeated the insurgency during Operation Murfreesboro. Upon redeployment to Fort Carson, the brigade reflagged to 4th Brigade Combat Team of the 4th Infantry Division, and the battalion reflagged to 1st Battalion, 12th Infantry Regiment.

The Second Battalion of the 9th Infantry Regiment is not active today, due to draw downs the 1st Brigade of the 2nd Infantry Division, which was based in Camp Casey in South Korea has been deactivated June 2015. The Second and Battalion had a twice a year tradition called the "Manchu Mile", which involves its members marching 25 miles (40.2 km) in full combat gear across Korea's mountainous terrain.  This is to commemorate an 85-mile forced march performed by the unit during the Boxer Rebellion.

The Third Battalion of the 9th Infantry Regiment is not active at this time.

The Fourth Battalion of the 9th Infantry Regiment was re-activated on 1 June 2006 and was assigned to the newly designated 4th Brigade Combat Team, 2nd Infantry Division, based at Joint Base Lewis-McChord, Washington. As the 4th Brigade is a Stryker Brigade Combat Team, this battalion of the 9th Infantry Regiment is now a fully mobile mechanized infantry unit. The battalion deployed to Iraq in the spring of 2007 and engaged in combat operations in Tarmiyah, the Battle of Baqubah, and other locations throughout Diyala and Salah Ed-Din.  At the same time they field tested the Army's Land Warrior next generation soldier technology.

The Fourth Battalion returned from Iraq in the fall of 2010 during the last days of Operation Iraqi Freedom. The Fourth Battalion also deployed in support of Operation Enduring Freedom from fall 2012 to summer 2013. It was then deactivated along with the rest of the 4th Brigade Combat Team and moved to Fort Carson, Colorado, where it has been reactivated as the 1st Brigade Combat Team, 4th Infantry Division and is the only remaining Manchu battalion still active today.

Distinguished Members of the Regiment (DMOR)

By order of the Secretary of the Army, the following individuals have been officially bestowed with the title of "Distinguished Member of the 9th Infantry Regiment" for their exceptionally meritorious service and distinguished accomplishments as a member of the Regiment in accordance with Army regulations:

1. CPT Richard A. Coutermarsh, DMOR, GCEG, IC, MCP, MEP, C.*C.O.H. (1st Battalion, 9th Infantry Regiment).

Honorary Members of the Regiment (HMOR)

By order of the Secretary of the Army, the following individuals have been officially bestowed with the title of "Honorary Member of the 9th Infantry Regiment" in recognition of their outstanding support and conspicuous service to the Regiment as a nonregimental member in accordance with Army regulations:

1. Mrs. Laura J. Coutermarsh, HMOR.

Lineage 
Constituted 3 March 1855 in the Regular Army as the 9th Infantry Regiment
Organized 26 March 1855 at Fort Monroe, Virginia
Constituted 3 May 1861 in the Regular Army as the 2d Battalion, 18th Infantry Regiment
Organized in October 1861 at Camp Thomas, Ohio
Reorganized and redesignated 21 September 1866 as the 27th Infantry Regiment
Consolidated in June 1869 with the 27th Infantry and consolidated unit designated as the 9th Infantry
Assigned 22 September 1917 to the 2d Division (later redesignated as the 2nd Infantry Division)
Relieved 20 June 1957 from assignment to the 2nd Infantry Division and reorganized as a parent regiment under the Combat Arms Regimental System
Withdrawn 29 April 1983 from the Combat Arms Regimental System and reorganized under the U.S. Army Regimental System

Honors

Campaign participation credit 
American Civil War:
Murfreesboro
Chickamauga
Chattanooga
Atlanta
Kentucky 1862
Mississippi 1862
Tennessee 1863
Georgia 1864
Indian Wars
Little Bighorn
Yakima War
Spokane-Coeur d'Alene-Paloos War
Wyoming 1866
Wyoming 1867
War with Spain
Santiago
China Relief Expedition
Tientsin
Yang-tsun
Peking
Philippine–American War
Malolos
San Isidro
Zapote River
Tarlac
Luzon 1899
Luzon 1900
Luzon 1901
World War I
Aisne
Aisne-Marne
St. Mihiel
Meuse-Argonne
Ile de France 1918
Lorraine 1918
World War II
Normandy (with arrowhead)
Northern France
Rhineland
Ardennes-Alsace
Central Europe
Korean War
UN Defensive
UN Offensive
CCF Intervention
First UN Counteroffensive
CCF Spring Offensive
UN Summer-Fall Offensive
Second Korean Winter
Korea, Summer-Fall 1952
Third Korean Winter
Korea, Summer 1953
Vietnam War
Counteroffensive
Counteroffensive, Phase II
Counteroffensive, Phase III
Tet Counteroffensive
Counteroffensive, Phase IV
Counteroffensive, Phase V
Counteroffensive, Phase VI
Tet 69/Counteroffensive
Summer-Fall 1969
Winter-Spring 1970
Sanctuary Counteroffensive
Counteroffensive, Phase VII
Armed Forces Expeditions
Panama
War on Terrorism

Iraq:
 Iraqi Surge

Decorations 
Presidential Unit Citation (Army) for BREST, FRANCE
Presidential Unit Citation (Army) for SIEGFRIED LINE
Presidential Unit Citation (Army) for ARDENNES
Presidential Unit Citation (Army) for HONGCHON
Presidential Unit Citation (Navy) for HWACHON RESERVOIR
Navy Unit Commendation for PANMUNJOM
Meritorious Unit Commendation for RAMADI(pending)
French Croix de Guerre with Palm, World War I for CHATEAU THIERRY
French Croix de Guerre with Palm, World War I for AISNE-MARNE
French Croix de Guerre with Palm, World War I for MEUSE-ARGONNE
French Fourragère in the colors of the Croix de Guerre, World War I
Luxembourg Croix de Guerre for LUXEMBOURG
Belgian Fourragere 1940
Cited in the Order of the Day of the Belgian Army for action in the ARDENNES
Cited in the Order of the Day of the Belgian Army for action at ELSENBORN CREST
Republic of Korea Presidential Unit Citation for NAKTONG RIVER LINE
Republic of Korea Presidential Unit Citation for KOREA
Republic of Vietnam Cross of Gallantry with Palm, Streamer embroidered VIETNAM 1966–1968
Republic of Vietnam Cross of Gallantry with Palm, Streamer embroidered VIETNAM 1968–1970
Republic of Vietnam Civil Action Honor Medal, First Class, Streamer embroidered VIETNAM 1966–1970
Presidential Unit Citation, Company C, 4th Battalion, 24 April 1969 to 26 April 1969
Presidential Unit Citation, 1st Platoon, Company B, 4th Battalion, 5 January 1968

See also
List of United States Regular Army Civil War units

References

Sources 
 McConnell, Malcolm, The Real Story of America's High-Tech Invasion of Panama, JUST CAUSE, New York: St. Martin's Press, 1991.
 1998 CNN story "Sex, The Army And A Double Standard"
 U.S. ARMY ANNOUNCES RANK REDUCTION OF MAJOR GENERAL DAVID R.E. HALE

Further reading 
  – Written by the regimental adjutant

External links 
 4/9 Infantry Manchu Association website

0009
009th Infantry Regiment
009th Infantry
009th Infantry
United States Regular Army Civil War units and formations
Military units and formations of the United States in the Indian Wars
USInfReg0009
Military units of the United States Army in South Korea
009th Infantry Regiment
Military units and formations established in 1855
1855 establishments in Virginia